Jacques Pollet (2 July 1922  – 16 August 1997) was a racing driver from France. He participated in 5 Formula One World Championship Grands Prix, debuting on 4 July 1954. He scored no championship points.

Complete Formula One World Championship results
(key)

References

French racing drivers
French Formula One drivers
Gordini Formula One drivers
1922 births
1997 deaths
Sportspeople from Roubaix
24 Hours of Le Mans drivers
World Sportscar Championship drivers